Emma Nevada (née Wixom) (7 February 1859 – 20 June 1940) was an American operatic soprano particularly known for her performances in operas by Bellini and Donizetti and the French composers Ambroise Thomas, Charles Gounod, and Léo Delibes. Considered one of the finest coloratura sopranos of the late 19th and early 20th centuries, her most famous roles were Amina in La sonnambula, and the title roles in Lakmé, Mignon, Mireille, and Lucia di Lammermoor.

Biography 

Emma Nevada was born in Alpha, California to Maria O'Boy Wixom and Dr. William Wallace Wixom, who was the physician for the gold mine camp there. She spent her early childhood in nearby Nevada City (from which she took her stage name) before the family moved to Austin, Nevada where a new silver mine had opened. A gifted linguist who learned sign language for the deaf and spoke Paiute, Washoe and Shoshone, she studied Spanish, Italian, French and German at Mills College in California as well as music. She then studied singing for three years in Vienna with Mathilde Marchesi before making her stage debut at Her Majesty's Theatre in London as Amina in La sonnambula on 17 May 1880. She was an adept fencer and also practiced with Indian clubs to maintain her physical stamina for singing opera.

Debuts followed at La Scala in Milan in 1881 and the Opéra-Comique in Paris in 1883 when she sang Zora in Félicien-César David's La perle du Brésil. In 1884 she toured the United States with Mapleson's opera company, after which she returned to Europe where she continued to sing in leading opera houses and concert halls. The Mapleson tour was the only time she sang on the opera stages of her native country, although she did return to the United States for concert tours in 1885, 1899, and 1901. Pablo Casals was one of the trio of musicians accompanying her in the 1901 concerts.

In October 1885, Nevada married Raymond Palmer, an English physician, who was to become her manager. The wedding took place in Paris with Ambroise Thomas giving the bride away. The couple settled in Paris and had one daughter, Mignon, who also became an opera singer under the stage name of Mignon Nevada. Mignon's godparents were Ambroise Thomas and Mathilde Marchesi.

Nevada's last performance was in Lakmé in Berlin in 1910, after which she retired from the stage and taught singing in England. Emma Nevada died near Liverpool at the age of 81. A medallion with her portrait, along with those of Giuditta Pasta and Maria Malibran, adorns Bellini's monument in Naples.

The actress Erin O'Brien was cast as Emma Nevada in the 1960 episode, "Emma Is Coming", on the syndicated anthology series, Death Valley Days, hosted by Stanley Andrews. The episode is set in Austin, Nevada, where she was reared. Rick Jason was cast as Duke Clayton, a local tough-guy who developed a fond interest in Emma, and Alan Reed played Emma's manager, James Henry Mapleson.

References

Sources 
 De Bekker, L. J., "Nevada, Emma", Stokes Encyclopedia of Music and Musicians, Volume 2, pp. 433–434. Originally published in 1908, published in facsimile by Read Books, 2007. 
 Encyclopædia Britannica, "Emma Nevada", 2009. Encyclopædia Britannica Online accessed 6 September 2009.
 The New York Times, "Mignon Nevada A Success; Has Scored Big Triumph in Rome as an Operatic Star", 15 March 1908, p. C2.
 Pryor, Alton, Fascinating Women in California History, Stagecoach Publications, 2003, pp. 109–110. 
 Rosenthal, H. and Warrack, J., "Nevada, Emma", The Concise Oxford Dictionary of Opera, 2nd Edition, Oxford University Press, 1979, pp. 345–346. 
 Watson, Anita Ernst, Into their own: Nevada women emerging into public life, University of Nevada Press, 2000. ,

External links 

 Emma Nevada: An American Diva detailed web site on Emma Nevada's life and career by Dr. Eugene F. Gray at Michigan State University.
 
 

1859 births
1940 deaths
19th-century American women opera singers
American operatic sopranos
People from Nevada County, California
Singers from California
Mills College alumni
Musicians from Nevada
20th-century American actresses
Classical musicians from California
20th-century American women opera singers
Musicians from Liverpool